Walnut Creek is an unincorporated community and census-designated place (CDP) in central Walnut Creek Township, Holmes County, Ohio, United States. As of the 2010 census it had a population of 878.

Located in an area with a large Amish population, Walnut Creek is a popular location for tourists.

History
Walnut Creek was laid out in 1826. Originally named New Carlisle, the village was renamed to Walnut Creek when the post office was established in 1841.

Geography
Walnut Creek is in eastern Holmes County, sitting atop a  ridge between Goose Creek to the north and Walnut Creek to the south. It is part of the Tuscarawas River watershed.

It lies at the intersection of State Routes 39 and 515. Route 39 leads west  to Millersburg, the Holmes county seat, and east  to New Philadelphia, while Route 515 leads north  to Winesburg.

Demographics

Education
East Holmes Local Schools operates Walnut Creek Elementary School in the community.

Walnut Creek has a public library, a branch of the Holmes County District Public Library.

References

Census-designated places in Holmes County, Ohio
Census-designated places in Ohio
Amish in Ohio